Ćazim Sijarić was a commander of a detachment of Muslim militia from Bijelo Polje (in Sandžak) during the Second World War.  Sijarić was one of the commanders of the Muslim militia, who was especially in favor of the annexation of the eastern part of Sandzak into the Kingdom of Albania.

Moslem militia in Bijelo Polje was founded by Ćazim Sijarić, Vehbo Bučan and Galjan Lukač. It was under control of Italian division Venezia. A deputy of Sijarić was Smajo Trubljanin. With other commanders of Muslim militia (including Osman Rastoder, Sulejman Pačariz, and Husein Rovčanin) Sijarić participated in a conference in village of Godijeva, and agreed to attack Serb villages near Sjenica and other parts of Sandžak. In early January 1943 the unit under command of Sijarić distinguished itself during attack of Chetniks led by Pavle Đurišić. In November 1943 German Hauptsturmführer Rumper ordered Muslims and Chetniks in Sandžak to cease their hostilities and to cooperate united under the German command. On 15 November he ordered to Sijarić to establish communication with local Chetnik detachments, as well as to end pillaging and attacks on Serb villages and return stolen livestock, and together with them and Muslim militia commanded by Galijan, to attack communist forces in Bijelo Polje. On 17 November Sijarić replied to Rumper informing him that he intend to follow his orders.

References

Sources 

 Sandžak Muslim militia
Place of death missing
Date of birth missing
Albanian collaborators with Fascist Italy
Albanian collaborators with Nazi Germany
 Albanian nationalists